al-Shifāʾ (الشفاء), sometimes ash-Shifa, is the Arabic for healing.

It may refer to:

Al-Shifa' bint Abdullah, a companion of Muhammad
dār al-shifāʾ, house of healing, a hospital
Al-Shifa Hospital in Gaza
Al-Shifa pharmaceutical factory, active in Khartoum between 1997 and 1998
Kitab al-Shifa, Book of Healing
The Book of Healing by Avicenna
Kitab ash-Shifa bi ta'rif huquq al-mustafa by Qadi Ayyad
Kitab al-Shifa by Ibn al-Rāhib